Elections to the Greater London Council were held on 5 May 1977.

Results

Turnout: 2,242,064 people voted.

References
GLC Election Results 

Greater London Council election
1977
Greater London Council election
Greater London Council election